Zhang Mingyu (born 3 October 2001) is a Chinese modern pentathlete. She won the gold medal in the women's individual event at the 2018 Asian Games held in Jakarta, Indonesia.

References

External links 
 
 

Living people
2001 births
Place of birth missing (living people)
Chinese female modern pentathletes
Asian Games medalists in modern pentathlon
Modern pentathletes at the 2018 Asian Games
Asian Games gold medalists for China
Medalists at the 2018 Asian Games
Modern pentathletes at the 2020 Summer Olympics
Olympic modern pentathletes of China
21st-century Chinese women